M. Sakthi is an Indian politician and was a member of the Tamil Nadu Legislative Assembly from the Sirkazhi constituency. She represents the All India Anna Dravida Munnetra Kazhagam.

References 

Tamil Nadu MLAs 2011–2016
All India Anna Dravida Munnetra Kazhagam politicians
Living people
21st-century Indian women politicians
21st-century Indian politicians
Year of birth missing (living people)
Women members of the Tamil Nadu Legislative Assembly